Keanan Chidozie Mbaeri Bennetts (born 9 March 1999) is an English professional footballer who plays as a forward for German 2. Bundesliga club Darmstadt.

Club career

Borussia Mönchengladbach
Bennetts joined Borussia Mönchengladbach from the Tottenham Hotspur academy in 2018. He made his professional debut for Borussia Mönchengladbach in the Bundesliga on 16 June 2020, coming on as a substitute in the 90th minute for Lars Stindl in the home match against VfL Wolfsburg, which finished as a 3–0 win.

Ipswich Town (loan)
On 2 October 2020, Bennetts joined Ipswich Town on a season-long loan deal. He made his debut for Ipswich as a second-half substitute in a 4–1 away win over Blackpool on 10 October. On 15 December, Bennetts scored his first goal for Ipswich in a 2–1 win over Burton Albion. Bennetts made 30 appearances during his loan spell at Ipswich, scoring once.

Darmstadt
On 21 October 2022, Bennetts joined German 2. Bundesliga club Darmstadt agreeing to a one-year contract.

International career
Bennetts made two appearances for the Germany under-15 team in 2014, having been eligible through his mother. He later switched to represent England internationally. He also declined to represent Nigeria, eligible through his father, at the 2019 FIFA U-20 World Cup.

Personal life
Bennetts was born in Edgware, Greater London to a German mother from Hamburg and a Nigerian father. He is fluent in German. His brother, Jayden, is also a footballer.

Career statistics

References

External links
 
 
 
 
 

1999 births
Living people
English people of Nigerian descent
English people of German descent
German sportspeople of Nigerian descent
Citizens of Germany through descent
Footballers from Edgware
English footballers
England youth international footballers
German footballers
Association football forwards
Germany youth international footballers
Tottenham Hotspur F.C. players
Borussia Mönchengladbach II players
Borussia Mönchengladbach players
Ipswich Town F.C. players
SV Darmstadt 98 players
Regionalliga players
Bundesliga players
2. Bundesliga players
English Football League players
English expatriate footballers
Expatriate footballers in Germany
English expatriate sportspeople in Germany